HD 21749 is an orange main-sequence star in the constellation Reticulum. It has an apparent visual magnitude of 8.143, which means it is too dim to be seen with the naked eye.

In 2019, it was discovered that the star has two exoplanets: a possibly rocky, hot sub-Neptune-sized exoplanet named HD 21749b; and an Earth-sized exoplanet named HD 21749 c. These exoplanets were discovered by the TESS spacecraft.

Stellar characteristics

HD 21749 is a K-type main sequence star (orange dwarf) with a spectral type of K4.5V, indicating it is smaller and cooler than the Sun. Its effective temperature is 4,640 K, which gives the star an orange color typical of K-type stars. Its metallicity—the proportion of elements other than hydrogen and helium—is approximately equal to the Sun's.

This star is moderately active, as shown by its spectral activity indicators and photometric data. These measurements indicate a rotation period of around 30 to 40 days, with a most likely value of 34 days. Stellar activity also creates radial velocity variations, which complicates the measurement of the mass of the planets in the system.

Planetary system

In January 2019, the discovery of an exoplanet around HD 21749 was published. The planet was identified from a single transit event detected by the TESS spacecraft, using data from the first two observation sectors of the mission. Since a single transit is insufficient to determine the orbit of a planet, astronomers used archival radial velocity data from the HARPS spectrograph to detect the planet's signal, which allowed the determination of its orbital period and mass. In April 2019, with two additional months of data from the TESS spacecraft, the orbital period of the planet was confirmed with the observation of new transits, and a second planet was discovered.

The inner planet, HD 21749 c (the second in order of discovery), is orbiting the star at a distance of 0.08 AU with a period of just 7.8 days.

The outer planet, HD 21749 b, orbits the star at a distance of 0.21 AU with a period of 35.6 days.

References

External links

Planetary transit variables
Planetary systems with two confirmed planets
Reticulum (constellation)
K-type main-sequence stars
021749
0143
016069
186
Durchmusterung objects